Veto is an unincorporated community in northern Limestone County, Alabama, United States.

History
Veto was originally known as State Line. The community was then known as Veto, named after a community of the same name located immediately across the state line in Tennessee.  A post office was established under the name State Line from 1875 to 1877. A post office was then operated under the name Veto from 1882 to 1955. Veto is the northern terminus for the Richard Martin Trail.

Demographics

Veto was one of four unincorporated communities listed in Limestone County on the 1880 U.S. Census, with a population of 69. The other three communities were Mount Rozell (39), Pettusville (88), and Salem (45). This was the only time these communities were listed on the census rolls.

Notable people
 Dick Coffman, former Major League Baseball middle relief pitcher
 Slick Coffman, younger brother of Dick Coffman and former Major League Baseball pitcher

References

Unincorporated communities in Alabama
Unincorporated communities in Limestone County, Alabama